Mizushima (written:  lit. "water island") is a Japanese surname. Notable people with the surname include:

Hiro Mizushima (born 1984), Japanese actor, producer, writer, and creative director
Koichi Mizushima (born 1965), Japanese former gymnast
Koichi Mizushima (scientist) (born 1941), Japanese researcher
Musashi Mizushima (born 1964), Japanese former professional footballer
Natsumi Mizushima (born 1984), Japanese retired professional wrestler
, Japanese women's basketball player
Takahiro Mizushima (born 1976), Japanese voice actor
Teruko Mizushima (1920-1996), Japanese inventor of timebanks
Tsutomu Mizushima (born 1965), Japanese anime director
Satoru Mizushima (born 1949), Japanese film maker
Seiji Mizushima (born 1966), Japanese anime director
Shinji Mizushima (born 1939), Japanese manga artist
Yū Mizushima (born 1956), Japanese voice actor

Japanese-language surnames